Charles MacIvor (born 23 January 1957) is a British skier. He competed at the 1980 Winter Olympics and the 1984 Winter Olympics.

References

External links
 

1957 births
Living people
British male biathletes
British male cross-country skiers
Olympic biathletes of Great Britain
Olympic cross-country skiers of Great Britain
Biathletes at the 1984 Winter Olympics
Cross-country skiers at the 1980 Winter Olympics
People from Sutherland